Electoral district no. 11 is one of the 12 multi-member electoral districts of the Riigikogu, the national legislature of Estonia. The district was established in 1992 when the Riigikogu was re-established following Estonia's independence from the Soviet Union. It was renamed electoral district no. 10 in 1995 following the re-organisation of electoral districts but reverted to electoral district no. 11 in 2003. It is conterminous with the counties of Põlva, Valga and Võru. The district currently elects eight of the 101 members of the Riigikogu using the open party-list proportional representation electoral system. At the 2019 parliamentary election it had 70,706 registered electors.

Electoral system
Electoral district no. 11 currently elects eight of the 101 members of the Riigikogu using the open party-list proportional representation electoral system. The allocation of seats is carried out in three stages. In the first stage, any individual candidate, regardless of whether they are a party or independent candidate, who receives more votes than the district's simple quota (Hare quota: valid votes in district/number of seats allocated to district) is elected via a personal mandate. In the second stage, district mandates are allocated to parties by dividing their district votes by the district's simple quota. Only parties that reach the 5% national threshold compete for district mandates and any personal mandates won by the party are subtracted from the party's district mandates. Prior to 2003 if a party's surplus/remainder votes was equal to or greater than 75% of the district's simple quota it received one additional district mandate. Any unallocated district seats are added to a national pool of compensatory seats. In the final stage, compensatory mandates are calculated based on the national vote and using a modified D'Hondt method. Only parties that reach the 5% national threshold compete for compensatory seats and any personal and district mandates won by the party are subtracted from the party's compensatory mandates. Though calculated nationally, compensatory mandates are allocated at the district level.

Seats
Seats allocated to electoral district no. 11 by the National Electoral Committee of Estonia at each election was as follows:
 2023 - 8
 2019 - 8
 2015 - 9
 2011 - 9
 2007 - 9
 2003 - 9
 1999 - 10
 1995 - 11
 1992 - 11

Election results

Summary

(Excludes compensatory seats)

Detailed

2023
Results of the 2023 parliamentary election held on 5 March 2023:

The following candidates were elected:
 District mandates -  Anti Allas (SDE), 1,970 votes; Rain Epler (EKRE), 3,366 votes; Ants Frosch (EKRE), 2,619 votes; Ester Karuse (KESK), 1,677 votes; Liina Kersna (REF), 4,073 votes;  Maido Ruusmann (REF), 1,500 votes; and Igor Taro (EE200), 3,275 votes.
 Compensatory mandates - Anti Haugas (REF), 569 votes; Eerik-Niiles Kross (REF), 1,428 votes; Andrus Seeme (REF), 723 votes; and Priit Sibul (IE), 1,420 votes.

2019
Results of the 2019 parliamentary election held on 3 March 2019:

The following candidates were elected:
 District mandates - Merry Aart (EKRE), 1,245 votes; Uno Kaskpeit (EKRE), 3,802 votes; Liina Kersna (RE), 2,343 votes; Ivari Padar (SDE), 1,457 votes; Hanno Pevkur (RE), 3,595 votes; Priit Sibul (I), 1,406 votes; and Tarmo Tamm (K), 2,824 votes.
 Compensatory mandates - Kalvi Kõva (SDE), 605 votes; Anneli Ott (K), 1,474 votes; and Andrus Seeme (RE), 764 votes.

2015
Results of the 2015 parliamentary election held on 1 March 2015:

The following candidates were elected:
 District mandates - Uno Kaskpeit (EKRE), 1,807 votes; Liina Kersna (RE), 2,387 votes; Kalvi Kõva (SDE), 2,081 votes; Heimar Lenk (K), 3,398 votes; Ivari Padar (SDE), 3,992 votes; Hanno Pevkur (RE), 3,816 votes; Priit Sibul (IRL), 1,491 votes; and Tarmo Tamm (K), 1,721 votes.
 Compensatory mandates - Maire Aunaste (IRL), 679 votes; and Arno Sild (EKRE), 523 votes.

2011
Results of the 2011 parliamentary election held on 6 March 2011:

The following candidates were elected:
 District mandates - Jaak Aaviksoo (IRL), 3,484 votes; Urmas Klaas (RE), 2,990 votes; Kalvi Kõva (SDE), 2,889 votes; Heimar Lenk (K), 2,807 votes; Ivari Padar (SDE), 3,227 votes; Valdo Randpere (RE), 4,794 votes; and Priit Sibul (IRL), 2,385 votes.
 Compensatory mandates - Inara Luigas (K), 1,481 votes; Meelis Mälberg (RE), 1,013 votes; and Ester Tuiksoo (K), 971 votes.

2007
Results of the 2007 parliamentary election held on 4 March 2007:

The following candidates were elected:
 Personal mandates - Ivari Padar (SDE), 5,522 votes.
 District mandates - Urmas Klaas (RE), 3,258 votes; Heimar Lenk (K), 3,711 votes; Margus Lepik (RE), 2,176 votes; Inara Luigas (K), 1,910 votes; Erki Nool (IRL), 3,178 votes; and Ester Tuiksoo (ERL), 1,722 votes.
 Compensatory mandates - Ivi Eenmaa (RE), 2,150 votes; and Toivo Tootsen (K), 761 votes.

2003
Results of the 2003 parliamentary election held on 2 March 2003:

The following candidates were elected:
 Personal mandates - Ivari Padar (RM), 5,253 votes.
 District mandates - Heimar Lenk (K), 2,487 votes; Robert Lepikson (K), 4,496 votes; Rein Randver (ERL), 2,568 votes; Janno Reiljan (ERL), 1,682 votes; Toomas Savi (RE), 1,987 votes; and Hannes Võrno (ÜVE-RP), 3,584 votes.
 Compensatory mandates - Meelis Atonen (RE), 604 votes; Margus Leivo (ERL), 792 votes; and Marko Mihkelson (ÜVE-RP), 1,313 votes.

1999
Results of the 1999 parliamentary election held on 7 March 1999:

The following candidates were elected:
 District mandates - Jaak-Hans Kuks (M), 1,569 votes; Georg Pelisaar (K), 4,459 votes; Arnold Rüütel (EME), 3,701 votes; Mart Siimann (KE), 1,874 votes; and Ülo Tootsen (K), 1,494 votes.
 Compensatory mandates - Janno Reiljan (EME), 1,234 votes; Paul-Eerik Rummo (RE), 1,235 votes; Rainis Ruusamäe (M), 613 votes; and Elmar-Johannes Truu (KE), 1,033 votes.

1995
Results of the 1995 parliamentary election held on 5 March 1995:

The following candidates were elected:
 Personal mandates - Kaido Kama (P), 8,225 votes; and Arnold Rüütel (KMÜ), 17,189 votes.
 District mandates - Eldur Parder (KMÜ), 729 votes; Ülo Peets (KMÜ), 617 votes; and Olev Toomet (KMÜ), 1,130 votes.
 Compensatory mandates - Valve Raudnask (K), 1,457 votes; and Toomas Vilosius (RE), 1,923 votes.

1992
Results of the 1992 parliamentary election held on 20 September 1992:

The following candidates were elected:
 Personal mandates - Jaanus Raidal (ERSP), 5,341 votes; and Jüri Toomepuu (EK), 16,904 votes.
 District mandates - Epp Haabsaar (ERSP), 1,271 votes; Kaido Kama (I), 3,139 votes; Paul-Olev Mõtsküla (EK), 154 votes; and Toivo Uustalo (EK), 51 votes.
 Compensatory mandates - Jüri Adams (ERSP), 833 votes; Ignar Fjuk (R), 732 votes; Tõnu Kõrda (SK), 1,179 votes; and Marju Lauristin (M), 1,780 votes.

References

Riigikogu electoral district
11
11
Riigikogu electoral district
Riigikogu electoral district